Thomas Ray Barnhardt (born June 11, 1963) is a former American football punter in the National Football League (NFL).  He played college football at the University of North Carolina and was selected in the ninth round (223rd overall) of the 1986 NFL Draft by the Tampa Bay Buccaneers.

External links 
Career statistics

1963 births
Living people
American football punters
North Carolina Tar Heels football players
Chicago Bears players
New Orleans Saints players
Washington Redskins players
Carolina Panthers players
Tampa Bay Buccaneers players
People from China Grove, North Carolina
National Football League replacement players